Fred Masagazi (1937–2009) was a Ugandan "Afrojazz" musician. He was the first Ugandan artist to have his song played on the BBC, with his song "Kolazizo", in 1963.

Music
Masagazi started his music career in 1955 as a singer in a Congolese band, "Tinapa", where he sang both Congolese and Luganda. His first song was "Atanawa Musolo", which he released a year before Uganda's independence in 1961. He later released "Osaana Okole" in 1962 and "Lucy Tuula" in 1963. Masagazi was an accomplished composer who sang for more than fifty years. He was among the few Kadongo Kamu musicians who could sing, play the guitar and dramatise his music on stage. He founded his own band, "UK Jazz Band" in 1963. His band disintegrated, forcing him to perform in various bands like "King Jazz Band", "Kampala City 6 Band" and "BKG Band". His song "Atanawa Musolo" was ranked by Daily Monitor as one of "The 50 timeless songs that bring back memories" in one of its pieces for Uganda's fiftieth independence anniversary.

Discography

Songs
Atannawa musolo
Noonya Lukia
Osaana Okole
Lucy Tuula
Alululu
Ndiwuwo
Kyali Kyetagesa

References

External links 
"The father of Uganda’s music recording industry"
"Lure of quick money keeps music quality poor - Wasula"
"Who will ensure our cultural identity?"
"We celebrate Uganda’s music legends"
"When Makeba, Mtukudzi visited "

1937 births
2009 deaths
20th-century Ugandan male singers
Kumusha
Jazz musicians